The Cleveland State Vikings men's soccer team represent Cleveland State University in the Horizon League of NCAA Division I soccer. The team plays its home matches at Krenzler Field and is currently coached by Kirk Harwat. The first season of soccer at Cleveland State was 1954 when the university was known as Fenn College.

Record by year

Totals updated through the end of the 2019–2020 school year.

NCAA Championship history

Head Coaching history

References

External links
 

 
1954 establishments in Ohio
Association football clubs established in 1954